Léon Huygens (1876–1919) was a Belgian painter.

Huygens was born in Auderghem, Brussels, and attended the Académie Royale des Beaux-Arts in Brussels. He specialised in landscapes, particularly of the Sonian Forest to the south of Auderghem and the coast at Nieuwpoort.

He volunteered for the Belgian army during the First World War, and was assigned as a war artist. He died in Paris in 1919.

External links
  Biography at arto.be

1876 births
1919 deaths
People from Auderghem
World War I artists
Belgian war artists
20th-century Belgian painters